The Cold Spring and Inscription Rock Historic District is a  historic district in Cimarron County, Oklahoma, near Boise City, Oklahoma that was listed on the U.S. National Register of Historic Places in 1994.  It is associated with NPS Master Plan #122.  The district includes a landscape;  it includes two contributing buildings and two other contributing sites.

It includes two significant features:  Inscription Rock, on the Cimarron Cutoff of the Santa Fe Trail, a rock outcropping with travelers' names carved upon it, and also the Cold Springs Creek Camp Site.  The camp site includes a stone building that served as a stagecoach station and a stone spring house.

References 

Cimarron County, Oklahoma
Stagecoach stops in the United States
Historic districts on the National Register of Historic Places in Oklahoma
National Register of Historic Places in Cimarron County, Oklahoma
Santa Fe Trail